

Champions
National League (split season):
 First-half: Boston Beaneaters
 Second-half: Cleveland Spiders
 World Series: Boston Beaneaters over Cleveland Spiders (5–0; 1 tie)

National League final standings

The National League played a split season schedule, with the teams that had the best record in each half of the season meeting in a postseason best-of-nine series, known at the time as the "World's Championship Series".

Statistical leaders

Events
March 4 – Following the collapse of the American Association, the National League holds its first meeting. They decide on a split season for 1892, with the winners from each half to meet in a championship series following the regular season.
June 6 – Benjamin Harrison becomes the first U.S. president to attend a game while in office, when he watches the Cincinnati Reds defeat the Washington Senators, 7–4 in 11 innings.
July 13 – The final games of the first half are played.
July 15 – Play resumes for the second half of the season after a one-day break.

July/August – After the Boston Beaneaters cut some players, they begin the second half slowly and the Cleveland Spiders take the lead. Some fans accuse the Boston club of purposely playing poorly "in order to force a playoff at the end of the season"—that is, to generate extra revenue.
August 6 – Jack Stivetts throws a no-hitter for the Boston Beaneaters in an 11–0 victory over the Brooklyn Grooms.
August 22 – Louisville Colonels pitcher Ben Sanders hurls a no-hitter in a 6–2 win over the Baltimore Orioles.
September 21 – Pitcher John Clarkson of the Cleveland Spiders records his 300th career win.
October 15 – On the last day of the season, Bumpus Jones of the Cincinnati Reds makes his major league debut with a 7–1 no-hitter against Pittsburgh, becoming the second pitcher to hurl a no-hitter in his first start.
October 17 – The first-half champion Boston Beaneaters and second-half champion Cleveland Spiders begin a best-of-nine "World's Championship Series" to determine an overall champion. The first game, pitched by Jack Stivetts for the Beaneaters and Cy Young for the Spiders, ends in a 0–0 tie after 11 innings.
October 24 – The Beaneaters win their fifth consecutive game over the Spiders to capture the championship.
November 1 – Statistics for the first 154-game season show that Dan Brouthers of the Brooklyn Grooms was the top hitter with a .335 batting average, and Cy Young of the Cleveland Spiders the best pitcher with a 36–11 record and a .766 winning percentage.
November 17 – National League magnates conclude a four-day meeting in Chicago where they agree to shorten the 1893 schedule to 132 games and drop the split season schedule (the league's next split season would be ). They also pledge to continue to reduce player salaries and other team expenses.

Births

January
January 2 – George Boehler
January 2 – Jack Kibble
January 2 – Merlin Kopp
January 3 – Roland Howell
January 4 – Charlie Miller
January 5 – Chuck Wortman
January 16 – Fred Bratschi
January 17 – Roy Grover
January 21 – Bernie Boland
January 27 – Tatica Campos
January 31 – Steamboat Williams

February
February 1 – Dixie McArthur
February 1 – Tom McGuire
February 4 – Eddie Ainsmith
February 4 – Rollie Naylor
February 6 – Goldie Rapp
February 8 – Manuel Cueto
February 12 – Tom Rogers
February 15 – Al Braithwood
February 16 – Ed Schorr
February 17 – Fred Brainard
February 17 – Nemo Leibold
February 18 – John Gallagher
February 19 – Weldon Wyckoff
February 20 – John Donaldson
February 22 – Doc Waldbauer
February 24 – Wilbur Cooper
February 26 – Harry Weaver
February 29 – Ed Appleton

March
March 6 – Chick Davies
March 6 – George Mohart
March 10 – Emil Huhn
March 12 – Bill James
March 12 – George Maisel
March 13 – Chippy Gaw
March 13 – Patsy Gharrity
March 21 – Bill Stumpf
March 22 – Lew Wendell
March 24 – Fred Trautman
March 29 – Harry McCluskey

April
April 1 – Claude Cooper
April 3 – Harry Kingman
April 11 – Ray Gordinier
April 11 – Red Smith
April 13 – Pat Martin
April 16 – Dutch Leonard
April 17 – Morrie Schick
April 18 – Jack Scott
April 19 – Bugs Bennett
April 19 – Dave Black
April 19 – Chick Shorten
April 22 – Ferd Eunick
April 25 – Snipe Conley
April 26 – Jesse Barnes

May
May 3 – Del Baker
May 4 – Zip Collins
May 4 – Jack Tobin
May 4 – Ted Turner
May 7 – Allan Travers
May 9 – Mickey Devine
May 14 – Bruce Hartford
May 17 – Hal Carlson
May 18 – Bill Batsch
May 19 – Jim Hickman
May 23 – Pop-Boy Smith
May 23 – Luke Stuart
May 24 – Oscar Harstad
May 24 – Joe Oeschger
May 25 – Doug Smith
May 31 – George Smith

June
June 1 – Ty Tyson
June 3 – Howard Lohr
June 4 – Herb Kelly
June 4 – Paul Maloy
June 4 – George Twombly
June 6 – Joe Pate
June 10 – Frank Gilhooley
June 11 – Clarence Woods
June 11 – Archie Yelle
June 16 – Jack Farrell
June 19 – Harry Daubert
June 22 – John Mercer
June 24 – Howard Fahey
June 24 – George Harper
June 27 – George Ross

July
July 3 – Bunny Brief
July 13 – Eusebio González
July 14 – Jack Farmer
July 15 – Bubbles Hargrave
July 26 – Sad Sam Jones
July 31 – Erv Kantlehner
July 31 – Art Nehf
July 31 – Mutt Williams

August
August 1 – Roy Sanders
August 5 – Fred Ostendorf
August 10 – Elmer Jacobs
August 12 – Ray Schalk
August 16 – Bill Keen
August 17 – Johnny Rawlings
August 19 – Rags Faircloth
August 20 – William Rohrer
August 25 – Tony Boeckel
August 25 – Johnny Jones
August 26 – Jesse Barnes
August 27 – Hal Janvrin
August 28 – Braggo Roth
August 29 – Roy Wood

September
September 5 – Cap Crowell
September 7 – Ginger Shinault
September 9 – Tiny Graham
September 11 – Ernie Koob
September 15 – Harry Lunte
September 17 – Tommy Taylor
September 21 – Elmer Smith

October
October 3 – Jack Richardson
October 4 – Delos Brown
October 7 – Adam DeBus
October 8 – Harry Baumgartner
October 9 – Arnie Stone
October 10 – Rich Durning
October 12 – Rupert Mills
October 13 – Chauncey Burkam
October 17 – Frank Madden
October 17 – Ted Welch
October 18 – Coonie Blank
October 18 – Bill Johnson
October 19 – Michael Driscoll
October 22 – Norm McNeil
October 24 – Dick Niehaus
October 28 – Bill McCabe
October 31 – Ray O'Brien

November
November 1 – Earl Blackburn
November 1 – Lefty York
November 5 – Flame Delhi
November 5 – Roxy Walters
November 5 – Yam Yaryan
November 10 – Jim Park
November 11 – Al Schacht
November 17 – Don Flinn
November 17 – Gene Steinbrenner
November 18 – Pedro Dibut
November 18 – Les Mann
November 18 – Harry Trekell
November 19 – Everett Scott
November 20 – Harry O'Neill
November 22 – Pi Schwert
November 24 – Harry Wolfe
November 27 – Bullet Joe Bush
November 30 – Josh Billings

December
December 1 – George Dickerson
December 1 – Dean Sturgis
December 2 – Chick Smith
December 4 – Johnny Meador
December 8 – Ellis Johnson
December 13 – Ivan Bigler
December 14 – Rudy Kallio
December 15 – Lou Kolls
December 16 – Scrappy Moore
December 19 – Fred Thomas
December 20 – Deacon Jones
December 25 – Walter Holke
December 25 – Karl Kolseth
December 26 – Lee King
December 29 – Monroe Sweeney
December 30 – Tom Connolly

Deaths
January 14 – Silver Flint, 36, catcher with the Chicago White Stockings for eleven seasons who batted .310 for 1881 champions
February 10 – Ed Glenn, 31, outfielder for three major league seasons; 1884, 1886, 1888.
March 11 – Cinders O'Brien, 24, pitcher for four seasons. Won 22 games for the 1889 Cleveland Spiders.
March 18 – Phil Tomney, 28, shortstop for Louisville Colonels from 1888 to 1890.
March 29 – Adam Rocap, 38?, outfielder for the 1875 Philadelphia Athletics.
April 18 – Ned Bligh, 27, catcher for four seasons, died of Typhoid fever.
May 21 – Hub Collins, 28, second baseman for the 1889–90 champion Brooklyn teams who led league in doubles and runs once each
July 12 – Alexander Cartwright, 72, pioneer of the sport who formulated the first rules in 1845, developing a new sport for adults out of various existing playground games; established distance between bases at 90 feet, introduced concept of foul territory, set the number of players at nine per team, and fixed the number of outs at three per side and innings at nine; founded Knickerbocker Base Ball Club, the sport's first organized club, in New York City, and spread the sport across the nation into the 1850s.
October 5 – Dickie Flowers, 42?, shortstop for two seasons in the National Association, 1871–72.
November 3 – Edgar Smith, 30, played in four seasons with four teams from 1883 to 1885, and 1890.
December 20 – John Fitzgerald, 26, pitcher for the 1890 Rochester Broncos.

References

External links
1892 National League season team stats at Baseball Reference